Sonny Boy is a 2011 Dutch film directed by Maria Peters, after the book by Annejet van der Zijl, based on a true story about interracial love during the WW2. The film was produced by Shooting Star Filmcompany. The film was selected as the Dutch entry for the Best Foreign Language Film at the 84th Academy Awards, but it did not make the final shortlist.

Plot
In  1928, a young man from Suriname named Waldemar Nods (Sergio Hasselbaink) goes to the Netherlands to study. His dark skin stands out and causes discrimination. He moves to lodging in The Hague with Rika van der Lans, who went to live separated from her deeply religious husband Willem, after she discovered him cheating with the maid Jans. She has taken all four of their children (Wim, Jan, Bertha and Henk) with her.

Waldemar and the seventeen years his senior Rika start a relationship and she becomes pregnant. She says nothing to Waldemar and goes to a woman for an clandestine abortion, but changes her mind. When she is four months pregnant she tells Waldemar. He is angry for not having been told, and leaves. Wim and Jan run away, to their father Willem. Waldemar returns, and when Willem visits Rika to tell her about a job opening in Indonesia, he asks her to come along. He will accept the baby as his own child. He changes his mind when he learns the father is dark skinned. He also gets a court order for Bertha and Henk to live with him, with success. He refuses a divorce, preventing Rika remarrying Waldemar. 

When the child is born, they call the boy Waldy, nicknamed Sonny Boy. Rika’s landlord terminates the rental, because of Rika's extramarital affair, especially with a dark-skinned Surinamese. Rika and Waldemar roam the streets with Waldy, when they meet an older Jewish man, Sam, who rents them a room. 

With financial support from Sam, Rika and Waldemar start a guest house in Scheveningen. When The Netherlands was invaded by the Germans, Rika and Waldemar are forced to give shelter to German soldiers. Later on they have to evacuate the guest house, as the area is cleared for the Atlantikwall defense system.

Because Rika is mother of five children, she is allotted a big replacement house. At the request of a young resistance fighter, Kees Chardon, she met through the help of a clergyman, Rika starts hiding people in her house. As the fee for Jews is higher than for Dutch, she chooses to hide Jewish people. After some time, a SS deserter hides as well. At first Waldy is not informed of the hiders, but after witnessing Sam’s deportation and a street fight Rika is visited by a collaborating official. Waldy hears something upstairs and discovers the hide aways.
After a raid, the hiders are discovered and arrested, together with Waldemar, Rika and Waldy. Waldy is released and goes to live with relatives and eventually to a foster family. This is not safe, because the Germans want to put more pressure on Waldemar and Rika during interrogations. 
Waldy is therefore placed with a farmer. When people come to the farm during the hunger winter, Waldy prevents a couple selling their wedding rings for food, by offering his parents’ rings. The farmer refuses Waldy’s rings and explains everybody tries to make some money during wartime, also Rika and Waldemar were paid for the hiding.

Waldemar is shipped to Neuengamme, but through his language skills, he is drafted for the mailroom. This gives him opportunity to send letters to Waldy clandestinely. After Hitler's death, Waldemar is deported to the ship Cap Arcona, which was bombed by British fighters. He jumps into the sea and manages to swim to the shore. On arrival on the beach, he is killed by two German child soldiers. Sometime later, Marcel and Bertha arrive at a train station where they meet up with Waldy and take him to live with his maternal grandparents. He is given a letter written by his mother who wished her children and parents luck, with hopes of visiting her husband. 

In the end credits, it is revealed Rika had died that year in KZ Ravensbrück after an epidemic of dysentery. Also, Waldy never knew the truth about his parents' deaths until sixty years later in 2004.

Cast
 Ricky Koole as Rika van der Lans
 Sergio Hasselbaink as Waldemar Nods
 Daniel van Wijk as Waldy (Sonny Boy)
 Micha Hulshof as Marcel
 Wouter Zweers as Gerard
 Marcel Hensema as Willem
 Gaite Jansen as Bertha
 Martijn Lakemeier as Jan
 Frits Lambrechts as Sam
 Raymond Spannet as landlord
 Joy Wielkens as Hilda

See also
 List of submissions to the 84th Academy Awards for Best Foreign Language Film
 List of Dutch submissions for the Academy Award for Best Foreign Language Film

References

External links
 Nederlandse filmrecensies Sonny Boy

2011 films
Dutch drama films
2010s Dutch-language films
Films based on Dutch novels
Films set in the Netherlands